Lake Dissoni, also known as Lake Soden, is a small lake in the volcanic chain in the Southwest Region of Cameroon.

There are only three fish species in the lake, but all these are endemic: A poeciliid (Procatopus lacustris, though probably a synonym of the more widespread P. similis), an undescribed catfish (Clarias sp.) and an undescribed barb (Barbus sp.). The atyid shrimp Caridina sodenensis is also endemic to the lake.

See also
 Lake Barombi Koto
 Lake Barombi Mbo
 Lake Bermin
 Lake Ejagham
 Lake Oku

See also
Communes of Cameroon

References

Volcanic crater lakes
Lakes of Cameroon
Southwest Region (Cameroon)